Icușești is a commune in Neamț County, Western Moldavia, Romania. It is composed of seven villages: Bălușești, Bătrânești, Icușești, Mesteacăn, Rocna, Spiridonești and Tabăra.

References

Communes in Neamț County
Localities in Western Moldavia